Tilton is an unincorporated community in Poweshiek and Keokuk counties, in the U.S. state of Iowa.

History
Tilton was platted in 1884. It was named for George W. Tilton, a railroad official. Tilton's population was 27 in 1902.

The post office in Tilton closed in 1931.

References

Unincorporated communities in Keokuk County, Iowa
Unincorporated communities in Poweshiek County, Iowa
1884 establishments in Iowa
Unincorporated communities in Iowa